Reginald Bishop AO (4 February 1913 – 3 July 1999) was an Australian politician who served as a Senator for South Australia from 1962 to 1981. He was a member of the Australian Labor Party (ALP), and held office in the Whitlam Government as Minister for Repatriation (1972–1974) and Postmaster-General (1974–1975).

Early life
Bishop was born in Adelaide and left school at fifteen and became a clerk in the South Australian Railways at the Islington Railway Workshops.  He was an official of the Australian Railways Union from 1937 until 1956 and Secretary of the South Australian Trades and Labour Council from 1956 until 1962.  He enlisted in the Royal Australian Air Force during World War II and served from February 1943 until January 1946 in Darwin and Borneo.

Politics

Bishop was an Australian Labor Party Senator for South Australia from the 1961 elections until his retirement in June 1981. After the election of the Whitlam government at the 1972 elections, he was Minister for Repatriation and Minister assisting the Minister for Defence. From June 1974, he was the second last Postmaster-General and oversaw the creation of Telecom and Australia Post as statutory authorities, replacing the former Postmaster-General's Department. He also implemented the introduction of FM radio and the abolition of television and radio licence fees.

Later life
Bishop was made an Officer of the Order of Australia in January 1984. He was survived by a daughter and son, but his wife of more than sixty years, Connie predeceased him in 1997.

References

 

Australian Labor Party members of the Parliament of Australia
Members of the Australian Senate for South Australia
Members of the Australian Senate
1913 births
1999 deaths
1975 Australian constitutional crisis
Officers of the Order of Australia
20th-century Australian politicians
Government ministers of Australia
Royal Australian Air Force personnel of World War II